"Somethings Gotta Give" is a 2004 single written by John Butler and performed by the John Butler Trio. Released on 6 December 2004, in Australia only, "Somethings Gotta Give" is a blend of funk, rock, blues, roots, and the traditional sound of a jam band. The cover art was designed and photographed by regular Tom Walker, and features a blurred image of fans dancing at a concert.

On the ARIA Singles Chart it peaked at No. 47, while it was listed at No. 7 on Triple J's Hottest 100 of 2004.

The Ben Joss and Tribal directed music video was nominated for Best Video at the ARIA Music Awards of 2005.

Track listing
All tracks written by John Butler, and mixed/engineered by Robyn Mai

 "Somethings Gotta Give" – 3:05
 "Ocean" [live] – 6:07
 "Somethings Gotta Give" [live] – 3.49

Personnel
John Butler – Amplified 11-String Acoustic Guitar, Vocals
Shannon Birchall – Double Bass, Backing Vocals
Michael Barker – Drums, Percussion, Backing Vocals

Trivia
 The single is an Enhanced CD and contains the film clip for "Somethings Gotta Give" when put in a PC.
 The single was released in Australia only.
 On recent versions of Sunrise Over Sea, the song is featured as a bonus track and is followed by 7:09 minutes of ambient sounds and cheeping birds.
 The music video for the single stars former Round the Twist star Jeffrey Walker, and features a cameo from Blue King Brown singer Natalie Pa'apa'a.

References 

2004 singles
APRA Award winners
John Butler Trio songs
2004 songs